Brad Voth (born February 25, 1980) is a Canadian former professional ice hockey player.

Career
Voth played junior hockey with the Medicine Hat Tigers in the Western Hockey League from 1996 to 2001. In the 1998 NHL Entry Draft he was selected 157th overall in the 6th round by St. Louis Blues. He spent two season with the Blues organization, playing for their American Hockey League affiliate the Worcester IceCats and their ECHL affiliate the Peoria Rivermen. After being released by the Blues in 2003, Voth spent a further two seasons in the ECHL, spending the 2003-04 season with the Columbus Cottonmouths and the 2004-05 season with the Texas Wildcatters.

In 2005, Voth moved to the United Kingdom and signed for the Cardiff Devils of the Elite Ice Hockey League. An imposing figure at 6'5” and 235 lbs, Voth played tough hockey, in a style not always seen in the EIHL. His role in the Cardiff Devils was an enforcer, demonstrated by his significant penalty minutes (PIM) totals during his stint, a total 1,762 in exactly 300 EIHL league games and was the EIHL's Most Penalised Player four out of his five years in the league. However, Voth was also an offensive presence within the team, eventually scoring 209 points for the Devils. His standout season was the 2007-08 season, when he scored 24 goals and 16 assists for 40 points in 50 games. He was also named captain of the team in January 2007 and held it for three years before being relieved of it in February 2010.

Voth sustained a nerve injury in a game against the Belfast Giants in December 2011 and sat out for several weeks until 4 February 2012 when Cardiff announced that Voth would retire with immediate effect and would begin work with the Fire Service.

Following his retirement, his jersey number #26 was retired by the Devils.

Career statistics

References

Career Highlights 
2005-06 EIHL Challenge Cup
2006-07 British Knockout Cup

External links 
 
 

Living people
Canadian ice hockey forwards
Cardiff Devils players
Columbus Cottonmouths (ECHL) players
Medicine Hat Tigers players
Ice hockey people from Calgary
Peoria Rivermen (ECHL) players
St. Louis Blues draft picks
Texas Wildcatters players
Worcester IceCats players
1980 births
Canadian expatriate ice hockey players in the United States
Canadian expatriate ice hockey players in Wales